Chandras (Greek: Χανδράς) is a village in the municipality of Orestiada in the northern part of the Evros regional unit in Greece. It is situated in the low hills between the rivers Ardas and Erythropotamos, about 20 km west of the centre of Orestiada. The nearest larger villages are Megali Doxipara to its southwest and Valtos to its northeast.

Population

History

Before 1913 it was ruled by the Ottomans. After a brief period of Bulgarian rule between 1913 and 1919, it became part of Greece. As a result its Bulgarian and Turkish population was exchanged with Greek refugees, mainly from today's Turkey.

See also
List of settlements in the Evros regional unit

External links
Chandra on GTP Travel Pages

References

Populated places in Evros (regional unit)
Orestiada